Since the death of the historical Buddha, Siddhartha Gautama, Buddhist monastic communities ("sangha") have periodically convened to settle doctrinal and disciplinary disputes and to revise and correct the contents of the sutras. These gatherings are often termed "Buddhist councils" (Pāli and Sanskrit: saṅgīti). Accounts of these councils are recorded in Buddhist texts as having begun immediately following the death of the Buddha and have continued into the modern era.

The earliest councils—for which there is little historical evidence outside of the sutras—are regarded as canonical events by every Buddhist tradition. However, the historicity and details of these councils remains a matter of dispute in modern Buddhist studies.

First Buddhist council  

The first Buddhist council is traditionally said to have been held just after Buddha's Parinirvana, and presided over by Mahākāśyapa, one of His most senior disciples, at a cave near Rājagṛha (today's Rajgir) with the support of king Ajatashatru. Its objective was to preserve the Buddha's sayings (suttas) and the monastic discipline or rules (Vinaya). The Suttas were recited by Ananda, and the Vinaya was recited by Upali. According to Charles Prebish, almost all scholars have questioned the historicity of this first council.

It is important to note that there was no Abhidharma collection at this time. Western scholarship has suggested that the Abhidharma texts were composed starting after 300 BCE because of differences in language and content from other Sutta literature.

All six of the surviving Vinaya traditions contain accounts, in whole or in part, of the first and second councils.

Second Buddhist council 

The historical records for the so-called "Second Buddhist Council" derive primarily from the canonical Vinayas of various schools. While inevitably disagreeing on points of details, they nevertheless agree that it was attended by seven hundred monks who met at Vaisali and that the bhikkhus at Vaisali were accepting monetary donations (which led to a controversy).

The main issue of the council seems to have been related to Vinaya or monastic discipline related to several loose practices by monks at Vaisali. According to traditional sources, disputes over monastic rule at the Second Council resulted in the first schism in the Sangha. However, various scholars do not think that a schism occurred at this time and instead happened at a later date.

Whatever the case, the first schism in the sangha (which is often associated with the Second council), is seen by scholars as most likely caused by a group of reformists called Sthaviras who wanted to add more rules to the Vinaya to prevent what they held to be certain lax disciplinary practices. This may or may not have been directly related to the meeting at Vaisali. This issue over new Vinaya rules eventually led to a split from the conservative majority, called the Mahāsāṃghikas who rejected these rules. This view is supported by the Vinaya texts themselves, as vinayas associated with the Sthaviras do contain more rules than those of the Mahāsāṃghika Vinaya. The Mahāsāṃghika Prātimokṣa has 67 rules in the śaikṣa-dharma section, while the Theravāda version has 75 rules. The Mahāsāṃghika Vinaya also contains evidence for this, since they discuss how the Mahāsāṃghika disagree with the Sthavira additions to the Vinaya (Mahāsāṃghikavinaya, T.1425, p. 493a28-c22.).

Virtually all scholars agree that this second council was a historical one. There is no agreement however on the dating of the event or if it was pre- or post-Ashoka (304–232 BCE).

Third council during reign of Ashoka 

In striking contrast to the uniform accounts of the Second Council, there are records of several possible "Third Councils". These different accounts often function to authorize the founding of one particular school or other. However, they all at least agree that it took place at Pataliputra, emperor Ashoka's capital.

Theravāda account 

According to the Theravāda commentaries and chronicles, the Third Buddhist Council was convened by the Mauryan king Ashoka at Pātaliputra (today's Patna), under the leadership of the monk Moggaliputta Tissa. Its objective was to purify the Buddhist movement, particularly from opportunistic factions and heretics which had only joined because they were attracted by the royal patronage of the sangha. The king asked the suspect monks what the Buddha taught, and they claimed he taught views such as eternalism, etc., which are condemned in the canonical Brahmajala Sutta. He asked the virtuous monks, and they replied that the Buddha was a "Teacher of Analysis" (Vibhajjavādin), an answer that was confirmed by Moggaliputta Tissa.

The Council proceeded to recite the scriptures once more, adding to the canon Moggaliputta Tissa's own book, the Kathavatthu, a discussion of various dissenting Buddhist views and the Vibhajjavādin responses to them. According to this account, this third council also seems to have led to the split between the Sarvastivada and the Vibhajjavāda schools on the issue of the existence of the three times. This doctrine seems to have been defended by a certain Katyayaniputra, who is seen as the founder of Sarvastivada.

Another function of the council was that emissaries were sent to various countries in order to spread Buddhism, as far as the Greek kingdoms in the West (in particular the neighboring Greco-Bactrian Kingdom, and possibly even farther according to the inscriptions left on stone pillars by Ashoka).

Sarvāstivāda account 
An entirely different account of a council during the reign of Ashoka is found in the works of the Sarvāstivāda tradition, which instead describe the first schism as occurring during the reign of Ashoka. Vasumitra tells of a dispute in Pātaliputra at the time of Ashoka over five heretical points downplaying the enlightenment of the arhat as the source of the first schism. These "five points" describe an arhat as one still characterized by impurity due to semen release (asucisukhavisaṭṭhi), ignorance (aññāṇa), doubt (kaṅkhā), reaching enlightenment through the guidance of others (paravitāraṇa), and speaking of suffering while in samādhi (vacibheda).

These same points are discussed and condemned in Moggaliputta Tissa's Kathavatthu, but there is no mention of this Council in Theravadin sources. The later Mahavibhasa develops this story into an attack against the Mahasanghika founder, who it identifies as "Mahadeva". According to this version of events, the king (who would be Ashoka at this time) ends up supporting the Mahasanghikas. This version of events emphasizes the purity of the Kasmiri Sarvastivadins, who are portrayed as descended from the arahants who fled persecution due to Mahadeva and, led by Upagupta, established themselves in Kashmir and Gandhara.

The two "Fourth Councils"

Theravāda 
By the time of the Fourth Buddhist Councils, Buddhism had splintered into different schools in different regions of India.

The Southern Theravāda school had a Fourth Buddhist Council in the first century BCE in Sri Lanka at Alu Vihāra (Aloka Leṇa) during the time of King Vattagamani-Abhaya. The council was held in response to a year in which the harvests in Sri Lanka were particularly poor and many Buddhist monks subsequently died of starvation. Because the Pāli Canon was at that time oral literature maintained in several recensions by dhammabhāṇakas (dharma reciters), the surviving monks recognized the danger of not writing it down so that even if some of the monks whose duty it was to study and remember parts of the Canon for later generations died, the teachings would not be lost.

Sarvāstivāda 

Another Fourth Buddhist Council was held in the Sarvastivada tradition, said to have been convened by the Kushan emperor Kanishka, in 78 AD at Kundalban in Kashmir.  It is said that Kanishka gathered five hundred Bhikkhus in Kashmir, headed by Vasumitra, to systematize the Sarvastivadin Abhidharma texts, which were translated from earlier Prakrit vernacular languages (such as Gandhari in Kharosthi script) into Sanskrit. It is said that during the council three hundred thousand verses and over nine million statements were compiled, a process which took twelve years to complete. Although the Sarvastivada are no longer extant as an independent school, its traditions were inherited by the Mahayana tradition. The late Professor Etienne Lamotte, an eminent Buddhologist, held that Kanishka's Council was fictitious. However, David Snellgrove, another eminent Buddhologist, considers the Theravada account of the Third Council and the Sarvastivada account of the Fourth Council "equally tendentious," illustrating the uncertain veracity of much of these histories.

Theravada Councils in Myanmar

Fifth Burmese Council (1871)

Another Buddhist Council, this time presided by Theravada monks took place in Mandalay, Burma, in 1871 in the reign of King Mindon. In the Burmese tradition, it is commonly known as the "Fifth Council". The chief objective of this meeting was to recite all the teachings of the Buddha and examine them in minute detail to see if any of them had been altered, distorted or dropped.

It was presided over by three Elders, the Venerable Mahathera Jagarabhivamsa, the Venerable Narindabhidhaja, and the Venerable Mahathera Sumangalasami in the company of some two thousand four hundred monks (2,400). Their joint Dhamma recitation lasted for five months. It was also the work of this council to approve the entire Tripitaka inscribed for posterity on seven hundred and twenty-nine marble slabs in the Burmese script before its recitation. This monumental task was done by the monks and many skilled craftsmen who upon completion of each slab had them housed in beautiful miniature 'pitaka' pagodas on a special site in the grounds of King Mindon's Kuthodaw Pagoda at the foot of Mandalay Hill where it and the so-called 'largest book in the world', stands to this day. This council is not generally recognized outside Burma.

Sixth Burmese Council (1954) 

The Sixth Council was called at Kaba Aye in Yangon (formerly Rangoon) in 1954, 83 years after the fifth one was held in Mandalay. It was sponsored by the Burmese Government led by the then Prime Minister, the Honourable U Nu. He authorized the construction of the Maha Passana Guha, the "great cave", an artificial cave very much like India's Sattapanni Cave where the first Buddhist Council had been held. Upon its completion The Council met on 17 May 1954.

As in the case of the preceding councils, its first objective was to affirm and preserve the genuine Dhamma and Vinaya. However it was unique insofar as the monks who took part in it came from eight countries. These two thousand five hundred learned Theravada monks came from Myanmar, Thailand, Cambodia, Laos, Vietnam, Sri Lanka, India, and Nepal. Germany can only be counted as the nationality of the only two western monks in attendance: Venerable Nyanatiloka Mahathera and Venerable Nyanaponika Thera. They both were invited from Sri Lanka. The late Venerable Mahasi Sayadaw was appointed the noble task of asking the required questions about the Dhamma of the Venerable Bhadanta Vicittasarabhivamsa who answered all of them learnedly and satisfactorily. By the time this council met, all the participating countries had had the Pali Tripiṭaka rendered into their native scripts, with the exception of India.

The traditional recitation of the Buddhist Scriptures took two years and the Tripiṭaka and its allied literature in all the scripts were painstakingly examined and their differences noted down and the necessary corrections made and all the versions were then collated. It was found that there was not much difference in the content of any of the texts. Finally, after the council had officially approved them, all of the books of the Tipitaka and their commentaries were prepared for printing on modern presses and published in the Burmese script. This notable achievement was made possible through the dedicated efforts of the two thousand five hundred monks and numerous lay people. Their work came to an end on the evening of Vesak, 24 May 1956, exactly two and a half millennia after Buddha's Parinibbana, according to the traditional Theravada dating.

Theravada Councils in the Thai tradition 
The Thai Theravada tradition has a different way of counting the history of Buddhist councils and names many other councils besides the ones listed above. A common Thai historical source for the early councils is the Saṅgītiyavaṁsa (c. 1789) by Somdet Wannarat, abbot of Wat Pho.

The first three councils are the traditional councils in India (1. Rājagaha, 2. Vesālī, 3. Patāliputta).

The fourth council is seen by the Thai tradition of Buddhist history as having taken place under the reign of King Devānampiyatissa (247–207 BCE), when Buddhism was first brought to Sri Lanka. It was supposed to have been held under the presidency of the Venerable Ariṭṭha, the first pupil of the Elder Mahinda. This is not usually counted as a council in other traditions, but the Samantapāsādikā does mention a recital at this time.

The fifth council is that of King Vattagāmanī Abhaya, when the Pali Canon was first put into writing in Sri Lanka in the first century BCE at Āluvihāra under the presidency of Mahātthera Rakkhita.

The sixth council, according to the Saṅgītiyavaṁsa, comprises the activities of the Pāli translation of the Sinhalese commentaries, a project that was led by Ācariya Buddhaghosa and involved numerous bhikkhus of the Sri Lankan Mahavihara tradition.

The seventh council is believed to have taken place during the time of the Sri Lankan king Parākkamabāhu I and presided over by Kassapa Thera in 1176. During this council the Atthavaṇ­ṇ­a­nā was written, which explains the Pāli translation by Buddhaghosa of the original Sinhalese commentaries. Parākkamabāhu also unified the Sri Lankan sangha into one single Theravada community.

Councils held in Thailand 
From this point onwards, the Thai tradition focuses on councils held in Thailand which were patronized by the Thai monarchy.

The first of these was held in the Mahā­b­o­dhārāma at Chiang Mai, which was attended by several monks. The Mahāthera Dhammadinnā of Tālavana Mahāvihāra (Wat Pā Tān) presided over the council, which was patronized by the King of Lan Na, Tilokaraj (r. 1441–1487). During this council, the orthography of the Thai Pali Canon was corrected and it was rendered into the Lan Na script. This council was held in 1477 CE.

A second Thai council was held in Bangkok from November 13, 1788, to April 10, 1789, under the aegis of King Rāma I and his brother. It was attended by 250 monks and scholars. A new edition of the Pali Canon was published, the Tipitaka Chabab Tongyai.

The third Thai council was held in 1878 during the reign of King Chulalongkorn (Rama V). During this council, the Thai script was used to make copies of the Pali Canon (instead of a modified Khmer script) and the canon was published in modern book form for the first time.

The next Thai council was held in Bangkok during the reign of Rama VII (1925–1935). This council saw a new edition of the Pali Canon published in the Thai script which was distributed throughout the country.

See also

 Ecumenical council
 Index of Buddhism-related articles
 World Fellowship of Buddhists

References

Bibliography
Cousins, L. S. (2001). On the Vibhajjavadins. Buddhist Studies Review, 18 (2), 131–182.
Dutt, N. (1998). Buddhist Sects in India. New Delhi: Motilal Banarsidass.
Frauwallner, E. (1956). The Earliest Vinaya and the Beginnings of Buddhist Literature.
Lamotte, E. (1976). History of Indian Buddhism. Paris: Peeters Press.
La Vallée Poussin, Louis de (1905). Les conciles bouddhiques, Louvain, J.B. Istas 
La Vallée Poussin, Louis de (1976). The Buddhist Councils, Calcutt : K.P. Bagchi 
Law, B. C. (1940, reprinted 1999). The Debates Commentary. Oxford: Pali Text Society.
Mukherjee, Biswadeb (1994).  The Riddle of the First Buddhist Council – A Retrospection in Chung-Hwa Buddhist Journal, No.7, pp. 452–473, 1994
Prebish, J. N. (1977). Mahasamghika Origins. History of Religions, pp. 237–272.
Prebish, Charles S. (1974). "A Review of Scholarship on the Buddhist Councils"; Journal of Asian Studies 33 (2), 239–254

 
Buddhist monasticism